Bahmayi-ye Sarhadi may refer to:
 Bahmayi-ye Sarhadi-ye Gharbi Rural District
 Bahmayi-ye Sarhadi-ye Sharqi Rural District